Papilio ophidicephalus, the emperor swallowtail, is a butterfly of the family Papilionidae. It is found in Sub-Saharan Africa.

The wingspan is 90–110 mm in males and 100–120 mm in females. It has two broods, one from August to December and the second from January to April.

The larvae feed on Clausena inqequalis, Calodendrum capense, Citrus species, Clausena anisata, Zanthoxylum capense and other Zanthoxylum species.

Taxonomy
Papilio ophidicephalus is a member of the menestheus species group. The members of the clade are:
Papilio menestheus Drury, 1773
Papilio lormieri Distant, 1874
Papilio ophidicephalus Oberthür, 1878

Subspecies
Listed alphabetically:
P. o. ayresi van Son, 1939  (South Africa, Eswatini)
P. o. chirinda van Son, 1939 (west-central Mozambique, eastern Zimbabwe)
P. o. cottrelli van Son, 1966 (south-central Zambia)
P. o. entabeni van Son, 1939 (South Africa: Limpopo Province)
P. o. mkuwadzi Gifford, 1961  (south-western Tanzania, northern Malawi, north-eastern Zambia)
P. o. niassicola Storace, 1955  (southern and central Malawi)
P. o. ophidicephalus Oberthür, 1878 (eastern Kenya, Tanzania, north-eastern Zambia, south-eastern Democratic Republic of the Congo)
P. o. phalusco Suffert, 1904   (South Africa)
P. o. transvaalensis van Son, 1939 (South Africa: Limpopo Province)
P. o. zuluensis van Son, 1939 (South Africa: KwaZulu-Natal to the north-east)

References

Carcasson, R.H., 1960, "The Swallowtail Butterflies of East Africa (Lepidoptera, Papilionidae)". Journal of the East Africa Natural History Society pdf Key to East Africa members of the species group, diagnostic and other notes and figures. (Permission to host granted by The East Africa Natural History Society)

Storace, L.,1955 Su alcune Papilionidae Africane, con descrizioni di nuove forme (Lepidoptera, Diurna). Memorie della Societa Entomologica Italiana 33:120-137.

External links

Butterfly Corner Images from Naturhistorisches Museum Wien

Butterflies described in 1878
ophidicephalus
Butterflies of Africa
Taxa named by Charles Oberthür